Mossaka   is a district in the Cuvette Region of the Republic of the Congo. The capital lies at Mossaka.

Towns and villages
 Mossaka

References

Cuvette Department
Districts of the Republic of the Congo